Charles Heinz may refer to:

 Charles Heinz (singer) (1940–2011), musician and religious leader
 Charles Heinz (fl. 1975), police officer allegedly maimed by employees of Morris Levy

See also 
 Charles Hines (disambiguation)